Daniel Iley (born 17 September 1996) is a Scottish gymnast.

Illy represented Scotland at the 2013 Northern European Championships in Lisburn, Northern Ireland and helped team Scotland win silver in the Team.

References

1996 births
British male artistic gymnasts
Living people